Tserkovski is a village in Karnobat Municipality, in Burgas Province, in southeastern Bulgaria.

References

Villages in Karnobat Municipality